The Ethel Zucker Memorial Fountain, or simply Zucker Fountain, is a fountain and memorial installed in Salt Lake City's Memory Grove, in the U.S. state of Utah.

References

Fountains in the United States
Outdoor sculptures in Salt Lake City